The 2017 Quebec Scotties Tournament of Hearts, the provincial women's curling championship of Quebec, was held from January 9 to 15 at the Aréna de Lévis in Lévis, Quebec. The winning Ève Bélisle team will represent Quebec at the 2017 Scotties Tournament of Hearts. The event was held in conjunction with the 2017 Quebec Men's Provincial Curling Championship.

The defending champion Marie-France Larouche rink were playing on home-ice in Lévis, but would lose in the final to Montreal's Ève Bélisle. It was Bélisle's first trip to the provincial championships since 2010.  Bélisle would defeat Larouche 7-4 in the final, having scored three in the second end and two in the fifth along the way.

Teams
The teams are listed as follows:

Standings

Scores
Draw 3
Perron 7-2 Néron
Bélisle 8-3 Lapierre
Larouche 7-2 Morissette

Draw 5
Perron 7-4 Lapierre

Draw 6
Bélisle 8-1 Morissette 
Larouche 8-4 Pelchat

Draw 7
Néron 9-7 Lapierre

Draw 8 
Bélisle 9-5 Pelchat
Perron 9-5 Morissette

Draw 9 
Morissette 9-8 Lapierre
Néron 9-3 Pelchat

Draw 10
Larouche 5-3 Perron

Draw 11
Lapierre 11-2 Pelchat

Draw 12
Bélisle 4-1 Perron
Larouche 6-5 Néron

Draw 13
Pelchat 9-3 Morissette
Bélisle 11-9 Néron

Draw 14
Larouche 11-4 Lapierre

Draw 16
Morissette 6-4 Néron
Bélisle 4-3 Larouche
Pelchat 8-6 Perron

Playoffs

Semifinal
Saturday, January 14, 2:30 pm

Final
Sunday, January 15, 12:00 pm

References

Quebec
Scotties Tournament of Hearts, 2017
Lévis, Quebec
Scotties Tournament of Hearts, 2017
January 2017 sports events in Canada